Noob Saibot  is a fictional character in the Mortal Kombat fighting game franchise by Midway Games and NetherRealm Studios. Initially introduced as a black silhouette of the series' other male ninjas and sharing their special moves, he was given his own unique movement style and appearance in later games. His name is derived from the surnames of Mortal Kombat creators Ed Boon and John Tobias spelled backwards.

As Noob Saibot, the character debuted as a hidden opponent in Mortal Kombat II (1993) and became playable in the console versions of Ultimate Mortal Kombat 3 (1996). He is first depicted as an undead wraith and member of the malevolent Brotherhood of the Shadow cult. His backstory was further expanded in Mortal Kombat: Deception (2004), where he is revealed as Bi-Han, the elder Sub-Zero from the original 1992 game.

Reception to the character has been generally positive, particularly in regard to his Fatality finishing moves. He has also appeared in various media outside of the games.

Character design and gameplay
The character's name comes from the last names of the creators of the Mortal Kombat franchise, Ed Boon and John Tobias, spelled backwards. During his first appearances, Noob Saibot's design was focused around an all-black exterior, with the staff stating "that's what he's all about". They found difficulties in making some versions, without him appearing  to look into bondage. For Mortal Kombat: Deception, Noob Saibot was the first character drawn and designed by Steve Beran. Beran attempted to make him a more distinctive character, focusing less on his all-black exterior. One design depicted him with a hood, but the idea was later moved to the new character Havik. An early alternate outfit depicted Noob Saibot in a black, red and blue outfit with a Japanese translation of "darkness" on the front flap. He was also shown unmasked, but this design ended up being used as Havik's alternate outfit. The use of a two-on-two combat was meant to be introduced in this game as well, but was only used with Noob Saibot and Smoke. Both characters were models for the use of such a concept and were intended to work together in the player's Fatality finishing move. Despite his surname being named after Tobias, Tobias did not know about the character until during the development of Mortal Kombat 3.

Bi-Han as the original Sub-Zero was introduced in the first Mortal Kombat game (1992), in which he participates in the eponymous tournament as he was ordered by the Lin Kuei to kill the host Shang Tsung and take his treasure. Prior to Mortal Kombat, Bi-Han was commissioned by the sorcerer Quan Chi to obtain an amulet. Quan Chi contracted both Bi-Han and Hanzo Hasashi of the rival Shirai Ryu clan to complete this task in order to ensure the amulet’s capture. Early on in the quest, Bi-Han kills Hasashi, who later is resurrected  as the undead specter Scorpion.  After Bi-Han delivers the amulet to Quan Chi, he is sent back to the Netherrealm by the thunder god Raiden upon learning it is the key to releasing the fallen elder god, Shinnok. Sub-Zero regains the amulet while fighting Shinnok and returns it to Raiden. After Liu Kang defeats Shang Tsung in Mortal Kombat, Bi-Han fails to accomplish his mission, and is killed by Scorpion, who sought to avenge his own death. Following Bi Han’s death, Quan Chi enlists Bi-Han's soul into the undead Noob Saibot.

The mantle of Sub-Zero is taken up by his younger brother Kuai Liang in subsequent installments.

Noob Saibot was then first introduced in 1993's Mortal Kombat II as a hidden nonplayable opponent whom players fought in a secret battle in the "Goro's Lair" stage from the first game after winning fifty consecutive matches. He was a solid black palette swap of Sub-Zero who fought with increased speed and Scorpion's spear. He returned as a secret character in Mortal Kombat 3 with the same attributes, but was instead a silhouette of Kano, since there were no human ninjas in the game, and in the Sega Game Gear port, he additionally had Kano's special moves and his "Eye Laser" Fatality. Upon being made playable in the console versions of UMK3 and the 1996 compilation title Mortal Kombat Trilogy, Noob Saibot returned as a palette-swap ninja, and one of ten human ninja swaps in the game overall. Although early versions of Mortal Kombat 4 featured him as a playable character, he was changed back to being hidden in the final arcade release, while his roster spot was filled by Reiko.

In reference to his past as the original Sub-Zero, Noob Saibot's character model is used for Sub-Zero's mirror match costume in the "Versus" mode of Mortal Kombat: Shaolin Monks.

Prima Games considered Noob Saibot to be one of the most "overpowered" Mortal Kombat characters; they state "he had an unblockable projectile attack, fought side-by-side with Smoke and even had ridiculous zoning in MK9."

Appearances

Mortal Kombat games
Noob Saibot allies with evil Outworld emperor Shao Kahn in Mortal Kombat 3 and Ultimate Mortal Kombat 3, but secretly observes the emperor at the behest of the Brotherhood of the Shadow.

In Mortal Kombat 4, he serves the fallen Elder God Shinnok. Mortal Kombat: Tournament Edition features Noob Saibot once again as a playable character, this time in the service of Shao Kahn. He leads an offensive against the forces of good and mortally wounds the Shokan prince Goro.

In Mortal Kombat: Deception, Saibot discovers the deactivated cyborg ninja Smoke deep within Shao Kahn's palace. He reactivates and enslaves him, intending to use his body as the basis for his personal undead cyborg army. In his ending, he is revealed as the resurrected form of Bi-Han, which would carry over to subsequent releases and the 2011 reboot of the continuity.

In the 2005 beat 'em up title Mortal Kombat: Shaolin Monks, Shaolin warriors Kung Lao and Liu Kang discover Saibot being pursued by his brother Sub-Zero in the bowels of the Netherrealm.

Mortal Kombat: Armageddon (2006) features Saibot as a playable character. In the game's story mode, he and Smoke invade the Lin Kuei ninja clan's castle and assimilate most of the defending ninja into their own subordinate warriors. They are eventually defeated by the warrior Taven, and Saibot is left in the castle unconscious. Raiden also tries to force him to recall his past identity, but to no avail.

In the 2011 Mortal Kombat reboot, which serves as an alternate timeline retelling of the first three games, Raiden receives visions from his future counterpart while attending the Mortal Kombat tournament. After one of the visions reveals Bi-Han's transformation into Saibot, he tries to prevent Scorpion from murdering the first Sub-Zero by offering to ask the Elder Gods to resurrect the Shirai Ryu. This fails when the sorcerer Quan Chi manipulates Scorpion with a vision of Bi-Han murdering his family. After his death, Bi-Han is subsequently resurrected by Quan Chi to serve as one of his undead revenant enforcers. Saibot supports Quan Chi and Shao Kahn, while also keeping in touch with the Cyber Lin Kuei, who had joined the latter's forces as well. Although he first appears during the second Mortal Kombat tournament, he does not receive a significant role until Outworld invades Earthrealm. He is sent to defend Quan Chi's Soulnado from Earthrealm's protectors, only to be defeated by his younger brother, who became the new Sub-Zero, and launched into the Soulnado by Earthrealm warrior Nightwolf, which dissipates the Soulnado and seemingly kills Saibot.

Saibot returns in Mortal Kombat 11, having mysteriously survived the Soulnado and acquired amplified powers. Hiding in the shadows for years, Quan Chi's death in Mortal Kombat X frees Saibot from enslavement. After the keeper of time Kronika, merges the past and present timelines, Noob pledged his allegiance to her in return for a dark clan of his own. He assists a time-displaced Sektor and a cyberized Frost in kidnapping Lin Kuei clansmen and converting them into cyborg warriors before attempting to stop the newly allied Scorpion and Sub-Zero from foiling their plans, only to be defeated and forced to retreat with Sektor's deactivated body. He reappears on Shang Tsung's island to stop Jax and Jacqui Briggs from retrieving Kronika's crown, but is defeated once again. Due to Shang Tsung’s interference in Aftermath expansion storyline, Noob instead appears alongside a reluctant present-Jax at a same time where they fought Fujin and Shang Tsung. Noob is defeated by the Wind God in their rematch when they recall their first fight two decades ago. As revealed in Sub-Zero's ending, Sektor corrupted Bi-Han before he became Saibot.

Other games
Noob Saibot is a secret character in game The Grid (2000).

Other media
Noob Saibot appeared in the 1997 film Mortal Kombat: Annihilation, as a warrior who emerged from Ermac during the latter's fight against Sonya, and was played by stunt performer J. J. Perry, who additionally portrayed Cyrax and Scorpion in the film. He and Ermac team up to assault Sonya with repeated kicks and punches until Jax comes to her aid and kills Noob Saibot with a fatal punch that he lands offscreen.

Noob Saibot (played by Kimball Uddin) made one appearance in the 1998 television series Mortal Kombat: Conquest as an imprisoned Outworld warrior mistakenly released by Siro and Taja and then recruited by a sorceress to assassinate Kung Lao. He was completely covered in black oil and wielded an Escrima stick.

Reception
Noob Saibot was ranked twelfth in UGO Networks' 2012 ranking of the top fifty series characters. "Mortal Kombat is all about the secrets and hidden characters—starting with Reptile and continuing with Smoke ... our favorite is the ludicrously-named Noob Saibot." Den of Geek placed him eighth in their 2015 ranking of the series' 73 playable characters. "Noob Saibot represents the dark sickness that comes from the cycle of violence. As explained in the reboot, by giving into his thirst for vengeance, Scorpion unleashed something horrible onto the world.", and ranked Noob as the 4th best altered fighting game characters. Complex listed him as the fifth-most underrated series character in 2012. "MK is known for having some of the best secrets to ever be hidden in a videogame." Noob Saibot joined the series' other male ninjas in being ranked third on GamePro'''s 2009 list of the best palette-swapped video game characters, but Game Informer, in 2010, was not high on seeing these same characters, aside from Scorpion and Sub-Zero, in any future series installments. The Trilogy version of the character was included in GameSpy's 2009 selection of unbalanced fighting game characters. "Noob Saibot has the 'Disabler.' It's a fireball ... which stuns you, which is as broken as it's possible for a fighting move to get without becoming allergic to electricity."

Noob Saibot's "Make a Wish" Fatality from the 2011 Mortal Kombat reboot, in which he and a shadow clone of himself rip their defeated opponent in half from the crotch upward by pulling their legs apart, received much critical attention due to its graphic content. In July 2011, Jon Stewart of The Daily Show played a video of the finisher while he explained the U.S. Supreme Court's ruling that the ESRB could regulate video games without government intervention. Kirk Hamilton of Paste commented, "Not only did [Stewart] pick a scene from what is arguably the most ridiculously violent game on the market, he also picked the most gory and painful-looking fatality." Complex ranked the Fatality as the series' best in 2013. Michael McWhertor from  Kotaku called it a "highlight" of the game, and though the finisher was not included in the site's 2013 feature "The Most Gruesome Video Game Deaths," it served as its introduction. "It's so ridiculous it stands out despite Mortal Kombat's already high level of gore." Robert Workman of Prima Games ranked it ninth in his 2014 countdown of the Mortal Kombat series' top fifty Fatalities. FHM'' included it among the reboot's nine "most brutal" finishers.

References

Action film characters
Action film villains
Fictional Chinese people in video games
Fictional martial artists in video games
Fictional Hou Quan practitioners
Fictional Piguaquan practitioners
Fictional assassins in video games
Fictional characters who can manipulate darkness or shadows
Fictional ghosts
Fictional hapkido practitioners
Fictional mercenaries in video games
Fictional murderers
Male characters in video games
Male film villains
Male video game villains
Mortal Kombat characters
Ninja characters in video games
Science fantasy video game characters
Video game antagonists
Video game characters introduced in 1993
Video game characters who can teleport
Zombie and revenant characters in video games